Scherr may refer to;

Surname
 Adam Scherr (ring name Braun Strowman; born 1983), American strongman and professional wrestler
 Allan L. Scherr, American computer scientist
 Johannes Scherr (1817–1886), German writer
Mary Ann Scherr (1921–2016), American designer and educator
 Tony Scherr, American jazz musician
 Uwe Scherr (born 1966), retired German football player
 Bill Scherr (born 1961), American olympic wrestler

Other uses
Scherr, West Virginia, U.S.
Scherr Formation, a bedrock formation covering several U.S. states